Route 103 is a highway in New Brunswick, Canada, running from Woodstock to Florenceville along the west bank of the Saint John River, a distance of 42 kilometres.

Route 103 begins at the interchange between the Trans-Canada Highway and Route 555 and passes the eastern terminus of Route 95, where it connects the interchange to downtown Woodstock and Interstate 95 via the Houlton Road. The route turns north along Main Street, following the Saint John River bank. At Somerville, a feeder road off Route 103 leads to the longest covered bridge in the world, connecting to the town of Hartland. The route ends at an intersection with Route 110 in Florenceville.

Until 2003, Route 103 began south of Woodstock at a former Trans-Canada intersection at Bulls Creek, but with a new twinned section of the highway opening and a small part of Route 2 being abandoned, Route 103 was shortened to end in Woodstock. A new highway, Route 165, now uses the former Trans-Canada from Meductic to Bulls Creek and the former Route 103 routing to downtown Woodstock.

See also
List of New Brunswick provincial highways

References

New Brunswick provincial highways
Saint John River (Bay of Fundy)
Roads in Carleton County, New Brunswick